Crow Rock is a rock located off of Linney Head, Pembrokeshire, in west Wales. It is considered to be a good diving location, because of its deep gullies, ravines and surrounding shipwrecks (including the S.S. Tormes and S.S. Prince Cadwgan). It is also known for its population of crayfish. Crow Rock is not more than 20 feet wide.

References 

Islands of Pembrokeshire